Francis Robert Matson (21 November 1905 – 1985) was a Welsh professional footballer who played at outside-left for various clubs in the 1920s and 1930s, spending most of his playing career with Cardiff City.

Football career
Matson was born in Cardiff and played his youth football with Cardiff Corinthians before joining Reading as a trainee. He then signed for Cardiff City, of the Football League First Division, in December 1926 but made only 14 appearances over the next three seasons. Following Cardiff's relegation to the Second Division in 1929, Matson was used more regularly, making 13 appearances in the league.

In August 1930, he was transferred to Newport County but made only one appearance before joining Southampton a few weeks later.

Matson spent two years at The Dell, spending most of his time in the reserves. His two first team appearances came in December 1931, when the club were trying to replace the injured Bert Jepson. In Jepson's absence, manager George Kay tried seven different players on the right wing, before Dick Neal was signed in February.

In the summer of 1932, Matson retired from professional football.

References

1905 births
1985 deaths
Footballers from Cardiff
Welsh footballers
Association football forwards
English Football League players
Reading F.C. players
Cardiff City F.C. players
Newport County A.F.C. players
Southampton F.C. players
Cardiff Corinthians F.C. players